"Make a Little" is a song recorded by American country music band Midland. It was released on September 25, 2017, as the second single from their debut album On the Rocks. The band members wrote the song with Josh Osborne and Shane McAnally, the latter of whom also produced it.

Content
Wide Open Country describes the song as "coyly sing[ing] about sex in a way that wouldn’t make your grandma blush" It features three-part vocal harmony and pedal steel guitar accompaniment.

Personnel
Adapted from On the Rocks liner notes.

Jess Carson - acoustic guitar, background vocals
Cameron Duddy - bass guitar, background vocals
Paul Franklin - steel guitar
Dann Huff - acoustic guitar, electric guitar, mandolin
David Huff - percussion
Charlie Judge - keyboards
Greg Morrow - drums
Derek Wells - electric guitar, guitar solos
Mark Wystrach - lead vocals

Charts

Weekly charts

Year-end charts

References

2017 singles
Midland (band) songs
Big Machine Records singles
Songs written by Jess Carson
Songs written by Cameron Duddy
Songs written by Shane McAnally
Songs written by Josh Osborne
Songs written by Mark Wystrach
Song recordings produced by Shane McAnally
Song recordings produced by Dann Huff
2017 songs
Music videos directed by Cameron Duddy